Dayton Gems may refer to:

Dayton Gems (1964–1980), defunct professional ice hockey team which played in the International Hockey League
Dayton Gems (2009–2012), defunct professional ice hockey team which played in the International Hockey League and the Central Hockey League
Dayton Gems (junior), ice hockey team which played in the Continental Elite Hockey League
Dayton Gems (soccer), soccer team which played in the USL Premier Development League